Tjiu Mau-ying (born 1936) is a Taiwanese politician who served as Minister of the Council of Agriculture from 1996 to 1997.

Tjiu earned a doctorate from the University of Göttingen in Germany. He led the Taiwan Provincial Government’s Department of Agriculture and Forestry, later becoming vice chairman of the Council of Agriculture. He assumed the top position at the COA on 10 June 1996 and resigned on 9 May 1997.

References

1936 births
Living people
University of Göttingen alumni
Taiwanese Ministers of Agriculture